Julius Nielsen (27 December 1901 – 1981) was a Danish chess player. He was a two-time Danish Chess Championship medalist (1934, 1943) and a Correspondence Chess International Master (IM, 1967).

Biography
From the 1930s to the 1940s, Julius Nielsen was one of Danish leading chess players. He participated many times in the finals of Danish Chess Championships and two times won medal: in 1934 in Vejle won bronze medal and 1943 in Helsingør won silver medal.

Julius Nielsen played for Denmark in the Chess Olympiads:
 In 1933, at reserve board in the 5th Chess Olympiad in Folkestone (+1, =6, -5),
 In 1935, at fourth board in the 6th Chess Olympiad in Warsaw (+2, =1, -5).

Julius Nielsen played for Denmark in the unofficial Chess Olympiad:
 In 1936, at fifth board in the 3rd unofficial Chess Olympiad in Munich (+7, =7, -5).

In his youth, Julius Nielsen played actively correspondence chess and known for his victory in a correspondence chess tournament over a future grandmaster Paul Keres. Julius Nielsen returned to the correspondence game in the postwar years. He achieved great success in the 1960-1970s.

Two times Julius Nielsen participated in World Correspondence Chess Championship finals:
 in 1965—1968 he shared 8th — 9th place in 5th World Correspondence Chess Championship;
 in 1972—1975 he ranked 16th in 7th World Correspondence Chess Championship.

In 1967 Julius Nielsen received the Correspondence Chess International Master title.

References

External links
 
 
 

1901 births
1981 deaths
Danish chess players
Chess Olympiad competitors
20th-century chess players